Stagecoach Inn, Old Stagecoach Inn, or Stage Coach Inn, may refer to:

Coaching inn

United States
(by state)
Stagecoach Inn (California), listed on the NRHP as Grand Union Hotel in Ventura County
Stage Coach Inn (Gibsland, Louisiana), listed on the National Register of Historic Places in Bienville Parish, Louisiana
 Stage Coach Inn (Lapeer, New York), listed on the NRHP in Cortland County
Old Stagecoach Inn in North Georgetown, Ohio
Stagecoach Inn (Vermilion, Ohio), listed on the National Register of Historic Places in Erie County, Ohio
Stagecoach Inn (Gruetli, Tennessee), listed on the National Register of Historic Places in Grundy County, Tennessee
Stagecoach Inn of Chappell Hill, listed on the NRHP in Washington County, Texas
Stagecoach Inn (Salado, Texas), listed on the NRHP in Bell County
Stagecoach Inn at Camp Floyd/Stagecoach Inn State Park, Fairfield, Utah
Stagecoach Inn (Fairfield, Utah), listed on the NRHP in Utah County 
Stagecoach Inn (Leicester, Vermont), listed on the National Register of Historic Places in Addison County, Vermont